Rémy Bonne (born 26 January 1989) is a French professional footballer who plays as a defender for Luzenac AP.

Club career
After two years in the amateur level, Bonne made his professional debut in July 2012 after joining Lens, in a 2–2 Ligue 2 draw against Le Mans.

References

External links
 
 
 Rémy Bonne foot-national.com Profile

1989 births
Living people
Association football defenders
French footballers
Ligue 2 players
ES Uzès Pont du Gard players
RC Lens players
AC Arlésien players
Footballers from Nîmes